Leland "Atta" Isaacs Sr. (1929–1983) was an American, Hawaiian slack-key composer, known for his C major tuning ("Atta's C," C-G-E-G-C-E), and for his work with Gabby Pahinui.

See also 

 Sons of Hawaii

References

External links
 Slack Key Guitar Book

1929 births
1983 deaths
American male composers
Guitarists from Hawaii
Slack-key guitarists
20th-century American composers
20th-century American guitarists
American acoustic guitarists
American male guitarists
20th-century American male musicians